The leaf lorikeet (Trichoglossus weberi), also known as the Flores lorikeet or Weber's lorikeet, is a species of parrot that is endemic to the Indonesian island of Flores. It was previously considered a subspecies of the rainbow lorikeet, but following a review in 1997, it is increasingly treated as a separate species.

Description 
Unlike all other members of the rainbow lorikeet group, the leaf lorikeet has an overall green plumage, with only a paler lime green chest and collar.

Habitat and conservation 
It remains fairly common, but its relatively small distribution could give cause for future concern. As well, its population is believed to be decreasing, with fewer than 20,000 mature individuals believed to be in the wild.

References

External links
 Leaf lorikeet. Oriental Bird Images.

leaf lorikeet
Birds of Flores
leaf lorikeet
leaf lorikeet